Liu Kwok Wa (born 15 February 1978) is a retired badminton player from Hong Kong.

Achievements

Asian Championships 
Mixed doubles

IBF International 
Men's doubles

References

External links 

Hong Kong male badminton players
1978 births
Living people